Erioderma is a genus of lichen-forming fungi in the family Pannariaceae. They are commonly called mouse ears or felt lichens, and are small, pale brown to olive-brown foliose cyanolichens with a fuzzy upper surface that have the cyanobacteria Scytonema as their photobiont.  Most species are found in the tropics of Central and South America, although three species are found in coastal regions of North America where they generally grow on mossy branches in humid sites.  All North American species are rare. Species of Erioderma can resemble Pannaria, Leioderma, or small Peltigera, but their fuzzy upper surface and lack of veins on their lower surface distinguishes them from these lichens.

Species
, Species Fungorum accepts 24 species of Erioderma.
Erioderma barbellatum 
Erioderma borbonicum 
Erioderma borneense 
Erioderma confusum 
Erioderma coriaceum 
Erioderma cyathophorum 
Erioderma divisum 
Erioderma glabrum 
Erioderma gloriosum 
Erioderma granulosum 
Erioderma laminisorediatum 
Erioderma latilobatum 
Erioderma leylandii 
Erioderma marcellii 
Erioderma nilsonii 
Erioderma papyraceum 
Erioderma pedicellatum 
Erioderma pellitum 
Erioderma peruvianum 
Erioderma polycarpum 
Erioderma pycnidiiferum 
Erioderma reticulatum 
Erioderma rigidum 
Erioderma sinuatum 
Erioderma sorediatum

References

Peltigerales
Lichen genera
Peltigerales genera
Taxa named by Antoine Laurent Apollinaire Fée
Taxa described in 1825